The 1920 Auburn Tigers football team represented Auburn University in the 1920 Southern Intercollegiate Athletic Association football season. It was the Tigers' 29th overall season and they competed as a member of the Southern Intercollegiate Athletic Association (SIAA). The team was led by head coach Mike Donahue, in his 16th year, and played their home games at Drake Field in Auburn, Alabama. They finished with a record of seven wins and two losses (7–2 overall, 3–2 in the SIAA). Auburn outscored their opponents by a margin of 332–49, a then school record for points, but were held scoreless in their two losses by the conference co-champions.

Schedule

References

Auburn
Auburn Tigers football seasons
Auburn Tigers football